Titanium lactate is a chemical compound, a salt of titanium and lactic acid with the formula .

Synthesis
A reaction of lactic acid with tetraisopropyl titanate in distilled water.

Uses
The compound was used as a mordant in leather industry under the trade name of corrichrome.

References

Lactates
Titanium  compounds